Underdog is the first studio album by Belarusian rock band Brutto, released on September 12, 2014.

History
Work on the album took place at the American studio Sterling Sound NYC. Ted Jensen was in charge of mastering, and Andrei Bobrovka recorded the sound. Before the release of the album, two official singles were released: "Brutto" and "Underdog". The album was officially released on September 12, 2014, without announcements or press releases.

Track listing

Reception
The album was received rather coolly by music critics. From the hastily recorded debut album of Mikhalok's new project Brutto, everyone suffered: the musicians, the leader, and the audience. In it Siarhei did not invent something new, but continued and sharpened the revolutionary line of the most radical records of Lyapis Trubetskoy like Rabkor. Punk-hardcore Brutto sounds even simpler, even more straightforward, and there is no more of this brutal energy in it than before, and the programmatic song of the same name Brutto with a jerking banjo sounds in general impermissibly sluggish and boring.

Personnel 
 Siarhei Mikhalok — vocals 
 Vitaly Gurkov — vocals 
 Denys Sturchenko — bass guitar
 Denys Shurov — drums

References 

Brutto (band) albums
2014 debut albums